Mind–body may refer to:

 Mind–body dualism, a philosophical view that the mind and body are distinct and separate
 Mind–body exercise, a form of exercise that combines body movement with mental focus
 Mind–body intervention, an alternative medicine
 Mind–body problem, a philosophy of mind
 Mindbody Inc., a software company
 Mindbody, a term coined by William H. Poteat to designate the means by which a person encounters the world

See also
 Bodymind, an approach to understand the relationship between the human body and mind where they are seen as a single integrated unit